In the sport of cricket, two batsmen always bat in partnership, although only one is a striker at any time. The partnership between two batsmen will come to an end when one of them is dismissed or retires, or the innings comes to a close (usually due to victory being achieved, a declaration, a time or over limit being reached, or the match being abandoned in mid-innings for inclement weather or, exceptionally, maybe between more than two batsmen, if one of the original batsmen is retired not out (rather than retired out), since the particular numbered wicket will not have fallen yet.

Batting in partnership 
Batting in partnership is an important skill. When two higher-order batsmen (usually these are the side's best batsmen) are together, they are largely free to play to their own styles (which may be quite different: Marcus Trescothick, an aggressive strokeplayer and Mike Atherton, a defensive stonewaller, enjoyed many successful opening partnerships for England) although "rotating the strike" (each allowing the other play to face the bowler regularly) is encouraged, and communication when calling runs is an important part of any partnership. Opening partnerships are entrusted with seeing off the new ball, later partnerships are largely charged with consolidation, often facing an aging ball, spin bowling and eventually the second new ball.

The concept of batting in partnership becomes even more vital once only one recognised quality batsman remains. His job is then to shepherd the tail-end batsmen, while attempting to eke out as many runs as possible, or simply to survive as long as possible when merely attempting to save the game. This usually involves attempting to minimise risk, by exposing the lesser batsmen to as little bowling as possible. To do this, boundaries and twos are preferred while singles are avoided in the early parts of an over (although this allows the fielding captain to set his field further back into a more defensive position, often tempting the batsman with an easy single) but because the bowling end changes at the end of an over, it is necessary to score a single (or much more rarely, three runs) to counteract this. While a single on the sixth and final ball of the over would be ideal, the field is usually set closer to make this harder and the batsman may prefer to rotate the strike on the fifth or even fourth ball, hoping that the tail-ender can survive for a delivery or two, rather than risking either having to take a dangerous run on the last ball (with the attendant risk of a run out) or not being able to get a single at all, leaving the tail-ender stranded on strike for the start of the next over (hence allowing up to six balls to be bowled at him)

Style of play 
Unsurprisingly, lower order partnerships are usually much smaller than those for the early wickets, but are often the most tactically intense. A lot of spectator enjoyment derives either from the frequent combination of a last recognised batsman adopting extremely aggressive play (in an effort to score as many runs as possible before he runs out of batting partners - one reason why aggressive batsmen like Andrew Flintoff and Adam Gilchrist are often deliberately placed relatively low in the batting order) and the constant risk of a wicket, the alternative situation where no recognised batsmen remains and the tail-enders (relieved of their responsibility to bat carefully for anybody else) often unleash their rarely seen arsenal of attacking shots, or alternatively the extremely tense situation which sometimes emerges towards the end of a match when a batting side, facing defeat, can only salvage a draw and save the match by batting to the end of the final day, which becomes difficult once the worst batsmen are in, and their survival is always nerve-wracking – English fans fondly remember the last wicket stand of Angus Fraser and Robert Croft, batting out the last few overs of the drawn Third Test against South Africa at Old Trafford in 1998, when the dismissal of either of them would have resulted in a loss. This contrasts with the spirit of earlier wicket partnerships, where the batsmen usually dominate and the bowlers have to work especially hard to take their wickets.

Effect on the opposition 
Large partnerships do more than simply add runs to the scoreboard, they may also serve to exhaust and demoralise the fielding team. Both of these were major factors at the famous Test match at Eden Gardens in 2001, when India's V. V. S. Laxman and Rahul Dravid put on a fifth wicket stand of 376 runs, staying at the crease for the entire fourth day's play without being dismissed. Despite having forced their opponents to follow on, Steve Waugh's highly regarded Australians were left emotionally and physically drained, slumping to a shock heavy (171 run) defeat. Even if nowhere near as damaging numerically, larger-than-expected last wicket stands can still be very demoralising, especially because as soon as the Number 11 batsman walks out of the pavilion, many of the fielders expect to be batting within minutes and start their mental preparations. If the last wicket partnership lasts much longer than they expect, it has an adverse effect on their preparation and composure, as well as their energy level deteriorating from extra time on the field. It is also damaging to the confidence of the bowlers if they are unable to dismiss a team's worst batsman relatively easily. A good example of this came in the First Test between Australia and New Zealand at Brisbane Cricket Ground in 2004. The Kiwis performed well for the first two days, and while the Australians did recover strongly on the third, the New Zealanders were still well in the hunt when Glenn McGrath, the Australian fast bowler and notoriously poor batsman, came to the crease to accompany fellow tail-ender Jason Gillespie with nine wickets down. Incredibly, the pair put on 114 runs, both achieving half centuries (McGrath's first in a long Test career in which he has never averaged more than 8 with the bat). The humiliated New Zealanders lost energy and focus, and when they finally removed McGrath and went in to bat, their batting order was devastated, collapsing to 76 all out, giving Australia an innings victory with a day to spare. During the second Test of the 2005 Ashes, Australia's tailenders Shane Warne, Michael Kasprowicz and Brett Lee famously held out during their second innings after the top order had been decimated by England's bowlers and nearly won a tightly contested match, losing by a mere 2 runs, the narrowest margin in Ashes history.

Left-right partnerships
It is commonly said that having a left-handed and right-handed batsman batting together is better than other combinations of handedness.

A similar phenomenon in baseball is the lefty-righty switch.

Test record partnerships by wicket 
Correct as of 1 November 2021

Top 10 Test partnerships (for any wicket) 
Correct as of 1 November 2021

* = unbroken partnership

First-class record partnerships by wicket 
Correct as of 1 November 2021

* = unbroken partnership

Top 10 first-class partnerships (for any wicket) 

Correct as of 1 November 2021

* = unbroken partnership.

One-Day International record partnerships by wicket 
Correct as of 1 November 2021

* = unbroken partnership

Top 10 One-Day International partnerships (for any wicket) 
Correct as of 1 November 2021

* = unbroken partnership

Bowling partnerships
Two bowlers may be said to be bowling in tandem when they bowl all of a certain set of consecutive overs.

References

 A few marathon partnerships from The Hindu
 Partnerships from Howstat
 List of record partnerships in Tests from ESPN.com
Tests - Partnership Records from cricinfo.com
 first-class partnership records from CricketArchive 

Batting (cricket)
Cricket terminology
Cricket records and statistics